Dogana is a village in Tuscany, central Italy, administratively a frazione of the comune of Civitella Paganico, province of Grosseto. At the time of the 2001 census its population amounted to 38.

Dogana is about 32 km from Grosseto and 7 km from Paganico, and it is situated on a hill between the Ombrone and Lanzo rivers. It was the ancient dogana (customs) during the Republic of Siena.

Main sights 
 Maria Bambina, main parish church of the village, it was built in 1955.
 Arc of Borgo, small and picturesque loggia, it is the access to the square of the village.
 Citernone farmhouse, it is attested in a document of 1717.

References

Bibliography 
 Lidia Calzolai, Paolo Marcaccini, I percorsi della transumanza in Toscana, Edizioni Polistampa, Florence, 2003.

See also 
 Casale di Pari
 Civitella Marittima
 Monte Antico
 Paganico
 Pari, Civitella Paganico

Frazioni of Civitella Paganico